Lloyd Cecil Finkbeiner (April 12, 1920 — March 30, 1998) was a Canadian ice hockey left winger. He played two games in the National Hockey League with the New York Americans during the 1940–41 season. The rest of his career, which lasted from 1940 to 1957, was spent in various minor leagues. Finkbeiner was born in Guelph, Ontario.

Career statistics

Regular season and playoffs

External links
 

1920 births
1998 deaths
Atlantic City Sea Gulls (EHL) players
Buffalo Bisons (AHL) players
Canadian expatriates in the United States
Canadian ice hockey left wingers
Cincinnati Mohawks (IHL) players
Dallas Texans (USHL) players
Guelph Indians players
Houston Huskies players
Ice hockey people from Ontario
Montreal Royals (QSHL) players
New York Americans players
Ontario Hockey Association Senior A League (1890–1979) players
Sportspeople from Guelph
Springfield Indians players